Morrison County is a county in the U.S. state of Minnesota. As of the 2020 census, the population was 34,010. Its county seat is Little Falls. Camp Ripley Military Reservation occupies a significant area in north-central Morrison County.

History
Dakotah and Ojibwe Indians lived in central Minnesota around the Mississippi River. French and English fur traders and voyageurs traveled through Minnesota from the 17th century to the 19th century. They used the river to transport their goods and trade with the natives. The county was named for fur trading brothers William and Allan Morrison.

In the 19th century three prominent explorers led expeditions along the river through the area that became Morrison County. Zebulon Pike came through in 1805. Michigan Territory Governor Lewis Cass led an expedition through the area in 1820. Explorer and scientist Joseph Nicollet created the first accurate map of the area along the river in 1836.

Missionaries were some of the area's first European settlers. Methodist missionaries settled temporarily along the Little Elk River in 1838. The Reverend Frederic and Elisabeth (Taylor) Ayer moved to the Belle Prairie area in 1849. They started a mission and school there for the Ojibwe. Father Francis Xavier Pierz came to the area in 1852 and started many communities in central Minnesota, including Sobieski and Rich Prairie (later renamed Pierz) in Morrison County.

The US legislature established the Wisconsin Territory effective July 3, 1836. It existed until its eastern portion was granted statehood (as Wisconsin) in 1848. The federal government set up the Minnesota Territory effective March 3, 1849. The newly organized territorial legislature created nine counties across the territory in October of that year. On 25 February 1856, Benton, one of those original counties, had a portion of its northern section partitioned off to create Morrison County, with Little Falls as the county seat. It was named for William and Allen Morrison, early fur trappers and traders in the area.

The event that prodded further development of the county was the building of Fort Ripley (originally named Ft. Gaines). In order to construct this military outpost, the Little Falls Mill and Land Company built a dam and sawmill in 1849. The company was formed by James Green, Allan Morrison, Henry Rice, John Irvine, John Blair Smith Todd, and Napoleon Jackson Tecumseh Dana. Fort Ripley was ostensibly built to protect the Winnebago Indians, who had been relocated by Henry Rice from Iowa to central Minnesota west of the Mississippi River, between the Crow Wing and Long Prairie rivers. Rice hoped the Winnebago would act as a buffer between the warring Ojibwe and Dakotah. His plan was unsuccessful and in 1855 the Winnebago were moved to the Blue Earth River in southern Minnesota.

The Little Falls area was first settled in 1848, and platted in 1855. Its growth occurred when the Little Falls Company (later called the Little Falls Manufacturing Company) built a second dam. This dam washed out, as had the first, and Little Falls entered a long period of economic depression and stagnant population. Bit by bit, Little Falls grew, until it was officially incorporated as a village in 1879.
  
Another wave of immigration occurred between 1880 and 1920. A wide variety of ethnic groups settled in Morrison County. This wave of immigration was spurred by the construction of the third dam at Little Falls in 1887. A group of investors from Louisville, Kentucky led by M. M. Williams financed the dam. To be sure their investment would succeed, they encouraged other major industries to move to the city, touting the water power.

Pine Tree Lumber Company, run by Charles A. Weyerhaeuser and Richard "Drew" Musser, was one business that took advantage of the water power, with their operations in Little Falls beginning in 1890. Hennepin Paper Company also started operations that year in the city.

In 1889 the Louisville investors drew up a charter to transform Little Falls from a village to a city. Nathan Richardson, one of Morrison County's original organizers, became the city's first mayor.

Geography
The Mississippi River flows south through west-central Morrison County. The Platte River flows south-southwest through the central part of the county, discharging into the Mississippi just at both rivers exit Morrison County at the border with Stearns County. The Little Elk River rises in Morrison County and flows east to discharge into the Mississippi just north of Little Falls, picking up the flow of the South Branch of the Little Elk River at Randall. The Mississippi also receives the flow of the Nokasippi River just above Camp Ripley. The Skunk River rises in the northeast part of the county, and flows west-southwest through the lower central part of the county, discharging into the Platte southeast of Little Falls.

The terrain consists of low rolling hills, partly wooded, carved with drainages and gullies, and with all available area devoted to agriculture. It generally slopes to the south, and slopes to the river valley from both east and west borders, with its highest point on the Camp Ripley Military Reservation, 2.4 miles (3.9 km) east and 1.4 mile (2.2 km) north of the east end of Lake Alexander, at 1,521' (463m) ASL.

Major highways

  U.S. Highway 10
  Minnesota State Highway 25
  Minnesota State Highway 27
  Minnesota State Highway 28
  Minnesota State Highway 115
  Minnesota State Highway 238
  Minnesota State Highway 371

Airports
 Little Falls/Morrison County Airport (LXL) - southeast of Little Falls

Adjacent counties

 Cass County - north
 Crow Wing County - northeast
 Mille Lacs County - east
 Benton County - southeast
 Stearns County - south
 Todd County - west

Protected areas

 Belle Prairie County Park
 Charles A. Lindbergh State Park
 Coon Lake State Wildlife Management Area
 Crane Meadows National Wildlife Refuge
 Crane Meadows State Wildlife Management Area
 Crow Wing State Park (part)
 Culdrum State Wildlife Management Area
 Ereaua State Wildlife Management Area
 Lake Alexander Woods Scientific and Natural Area
 Little Elk State Wildlife Management Area
 Mud Lake State Wildlife Management Area
 Neitermeier State Wildlife Management Area
 Popple Lake State Wildlife Management Area
 Rice-Skunk Lake State Wildlife Management Area
 Richardson State Wildlife Management Area
 Ripley Esker Scientific and Natural Area
 Sponsa State Wildlife Management Area
 Wittiker State Wildlife Management Area

Demographics

2000 census
As of the 2000 census, there were 31,712 people, 11,816 households, and 8,460 families in the county. The population density was 28.2/sqmi (10.9/km2). There were 13,870 housing units at an average density of 12.3/sqmi (4.76/km2). The racial makeup of the county was 98.48% White, 0.21% Black or African American, 0.32% Native American, 0.25% Asian, 0.03% Pacific Islander, 0.15% from other races, and 0.55% from two or more races. 0.64% of the population were Hispanic or Latino of any race. 45.4% were of German, 18.8% Polish, 7.3% Norwegian and 5.7% Swedish ancestry. 96.7% spoke English, 1.4% Spanish and 1.2% German as their first language.

There were 11,816 households, out of which 34.50% had children under the age of 18 living with them, 59.40% were married couples living together, 7.80% had a female householder with no husband present, and 28.40% were non-families. 24.90% of all households were made up of individuals, and 11.80% had someone living alone who was 65 years of age or older. The average household size was 2.64 and the average family size was 3.15.

The county population contained 28.00% under the age of 18, 8.00% from 18 to 24, 26.70% from 25 to 44, 21.70% from 45 to 64, and 15.60% who were 65 years of age or older. The median age was 37 years. For every 100 females there were 101.20 males. For every 100 females age 18 and over, there were 99.50 males.

The median income for a household in the county was $37,047, and the median income for a family was $44,175. Males had a median income of $31,037 versus $22,244 for females. The per capita income for the county was $16,566. About 7.50% of families and 11.10% of the population were below the poverty line, including 11.40% of those under age 18 and 18.50% of those age 65 or over.

2020 Census

Communities

Cities

 Bowlus
 Buckman
 Elmdale
 Flensburg
 Genola
 Harding
 Hillman
 Lastrup
 Little Falls (county seat)
 Motley (part)
 Pierz
 Randall
 Royalton (part)
 Sobieski
 Swanville (part)
 Upsala

Unincorporated communities

 Belle Prairie
 Center Valley
 Cushing
 Darling
 Freedhem
 Gregory
 Lincoln
 Little Rock
 Morrill
 North Prairie
 Platte
 Ramey
 Shamineau Park
 Sullivan
 Vawter

Townships

 Agram Township
 Belle Prairie Township
 Bellevue Township
 Buckman Township
 Buh Township
 Culdrum Township
 Cushing Township
 Darling Township
 Elmdale Township
 Granite Township
 Green Prairie Township
 Hillman Township
 Lakin Township
 Leigh Township
 Little Falls Township
 Morrill Township
 Motley Township
 Mount Morris Township
 Parker Township
 Pierz Township
 Pike Creek Township
 Platte Township
 Pulaski Township
 Rail Prairie Township (now defunct)
 Richardson Township
 Ripley Township
 Rosing Township
 Scandia Valley Township
 Swan River Township
 Swanville Township
 Two Rivers Township

Politics
In previous decades, Morrison County voters were fairly balanced, but in the past few years the county has swung Republican. The county has selected the Republican nominee for president in 78% of elections since 1980.

See also
 Great River Regional Library
 National Register of Historic Places listings in Morrison County, Minnesota
 Byron David Smith killings

References

External links
 Morrison County government website
 Morrison County Record (local newspaper)
 Morrison County Death Index
 Morrison County Historical Society
 General Highway Map of Morrison County (western portion and  eastern portion) from the Minnesota Department of Transportation

 
Minnesota counties
Minnesota counties on the Mississippi River
1856 establishments in Minnesota Territory
Populated places established in 1856